Kibaoni is a village on the Tanzanian island of Unguja, part of Zanzibar. It is located in the central north of the island, four kilometres to the east of Mkokotoni.

References

Villages in Zanzibar